Funk House may refer to:

Funk House (Olympia, Washington), listed on the National Register of Historic Places in Thurston County
Funk House (Jennings, Louisiana), listed on the National Register of Historic Places in Jefferson Davis Parish, Louisiana

See also
Jacob Funk House and Barn, Springfield, Pennsylvania, listed on the National Register of Historic Places in Bucks County
Joseph Funk House, Singers Glen, Virginia, listed on the National Register of Historic Places in Rockingham County
Harriet Funk House, Jeffersontown, Kentucky, listed on the National Register of Historic Places in Jefferson County, Kentucky
James H. Funk House, Jeffersontown, Kentucky, listed on the National Register of Historic Places in Jefferson County, Kentucky
Funky house, a subgenre of house music; a type of dance music